Hubert Jeffrey Pagaspas Webb (born November 7, 1968), is the third son of Freddie Webb, as well as the brother of Pinky Webb and Jason Webb. He gained prominence as a suspect in the Vizconde murders.

Vizconde murders 

Webb was the prime suspect of the infamous homicide that occurred on June 30, 1991. On April 28, 1995, National Bureau of Investigations asset and self-confessed drug user Jessica Alfaro came forward to police authorities to shed light on the killing of the Vizconde family. In a decision dated January 6, 2000, Parañaque Regional Trial Court Judge Amelita Tolentino convicted Webb and the co-accused Antonio Lejano II, Peter Estrada (Alfaro's former boyfriend), Hospicio Fernandez, Michael Gatchalian and Miguel Rodriguez, and sentenced them to life imprisonment. Remained charged and being fugitives until now are Joey Filart and Artemio Ventura. Also found guilty and sentenced to fifteen years in prison for destroying evidence was Parañaque City policeman Gerardo Biong. On November 30, 2010, Biong was released from jail.

Acquittal
On December 14, 2010 Webb with companions Lejano, Gatchalian, Rodriguez, Fernandez and Estrada, was acquitted by the Supreme Court of all charges after fifteen years and four months of imprisonment upon finding that the prosecution failed to prove that the accused are guilty beyond reasonable doubt. Voting seven for, four against, and four abstaining, the justices concluded that Jessica Alfaro was not an actual eyewitness to the crime, but a National Bureau of Investigation (NBI) asset pretending to be an eyewitness.

References

External links
Vizconde Trial
Conviction of Hubert Webb et al. upheld
Hubert Webb Acquitted
SC acquits Hubert Webb, 6 others in Vizconde massacre

1968 births
Living people
People from Parañaque
Kapampangan people
Filipino people of American descent
American people wrongfully convicted of murder
Hubert